Tikamgarh Assembly constituency is one of the 230 Vidhan Sabha (Legislative Assembly) constituencies of Madhya Pradesh state in central India. This constituency came into existence in 1951, as one of the 48 Vidhan Sabha constituencies of the erstwhile Vindhya Pradesh state.

Overview
Tikamgarh (constituency number 43) is one of the 5 Vidhan Sabha constituencies located in Tikamgarh district. This constituency covers the entire Tikamgarh tehsil of the district.

Tikamgarh is part of Tikamgarh Lok Sabha constituency along with seven other Vidhan Sabha segments, namely, Jatara, Prithvipur, Niwari and Khargapur in this district and Maharajpur, Chhatarpur and Bijawar in Chhatarpur district.

Members of Legislative Assembly
As from a constituency of Vindhya Pradesh:
 1951: Krishna Kant, Kisan Mazdoor Praja Party / Rilli Chamar, Socialist Party 
As from a constituency of Madhya Pradesh:
 1957: Ram Krishna, Indian National Congress
 1962: Gyanendra Singh Dev, Independent 
 1967: Gyanendra Singh Dev, Indian National Congress
 1972: Sardar Singh, Indian National Congress
 1977: Maganlal Goyal, Janata Party
 1980: Sardar Singh, Indian National Congress (I)
 1985: Yadvendra Singh, Indian National Congress
 1990: Maganlal Goyal, Bharatiya Janata Party
 1993: Yadvendra Singh, Indian National Congress
 1998: Maganlal Goyal, Bharatiya Janata Party
 2003: Akhand Pratap Singh Yadav, Bharatiya Janata Party
 2008: Yadvendra Singh, Indian National Congress
 2013: Krishna Kumar Shrivastava, Bharatiya Janata Party

See also
 Tikamgarh

References

Tikamgarh district
Assembly constituencies of Madhya Pradesh